Argentina sent a delegation to compete at the 2008 Summer Paralympics in Beijing. The country's flagbearer at the Games' opening ceremony was football player Silvio Velo.

Medalists

Sports

Athletics

Men's track

Men's field

Women's track

Women's field

Boccia

Cycling

Men's road

Men's track

Football 5-a-side

The men's football 5-a-side team won the bronze medal after defeating Spain in the bronze medal match.

Players
Gonzalo Abbas Hachache
Diego Cerega
Eduardo Diaz
Ivan Figueroa
Jose Luiz Jimenez
Dario Aldo Lencina
Antonio Mendoza
Lucas Rodriguez
Silvio Mauricio Velo

Tournament

Bronze medal match

Judo

Swimming

Men

Women

Table tennis

Wheelchair tennis

See also
2008 Summer Paralympics
Argentina at the Paralympics
Argentina at the 2008 Summer Olympics

External links
Beijing 2008 Paralympic Games Official Site
International Paralympic Committee

References

Nations at the 2008 Summer Paralympics
2008
Paralympics